The exosphere (  "outside, external, beyond",   "sphere") is a thin, atmosphere-like volume surrounding a planet or natural satellite where molecules are gravitationally bound to that body, but where the density is so low that the molecules are essentially collision-less. In the case of bodies with substantial atmospheres, such as Earth's atmosphere, the exosphere is the uppermost layer, where the atmosphere thins out and merges with outer space. It is located directly above the thermosphere. Very little is known about it due to a lack of research. Mercury, the Moon, Ceres, Europa, and Ganymede have surface boundary exospheres, which are exospheres without a denser atmosphere underneath. The Earth's exosphere is mostly hydrogen and helium, with some heavier atoms and molecules near the base.

Surface boundary exosphere
Mercury, Ceres and several large natural satellites, such as the Moon, Europa, and Ganymede, have exospheres without a denser atmosphere underneath, referred to as a surface boundary exosphere.  Here, molecules are ejected on elliptic trajectories until they collide with the surface. Smaller bodies such as asteroids, in which the molecules emitted from the surface escape to space, are not considered to have exospheres.

Earth's exosphere
The most common molecules within Earth's exosphere are those of the lightest atmospheric gases. Hydrogen is present throughout the exosphere, with some helium, carbon dioxide, and atomic oxygen near its base. Because it can be hard to define the boundary between the exosphere and outer space (see "Upper boundary of Earth" at the end of this section), the exosphere may be considered a part of the interplanetary medium or outer space. The height of the exosphere is between 700 and 10,000 km from the earth's surface.

Lower boundary of Earth

The lower boundary of the exosphere is called the exobase. It is also called the  'critical altitude' as this is the altitude where barometric conditions no longer apply. Atmospheric temperature becomes nearly a constant above this altitude. On Earth, the altitude of the exobase ranges from about  depending on solar activity.

The exobase can be defined in one of two ways:

If we define the exobase as the height at which upward-traveling molecules experience one collision on average, then at this position the mean free path of a molecule is equal to one pressure scale height. This is shown in the following. Consider a volume of air, with horizontal area  and height equal to the mean free path , at pressure  and temperature . For an ideal gas, the number of molecules contained in it is:
 

where  is the universal gas constant. From the requirement that each molecule traveling upward undergoes on average one collision, the pressure is:

 

where  is the mean molecular mass of the gas. Solving these two equations gives:

 

which is the equation for the pressure scale height. As the pressure scale height is almost equal to the density scale height of the primary constituent, and because the Knudsen number is the ratio of mean free path and typical density fluctuation scale, this means that the exobase lies in the region where .

The fluctuation in the height of the exobase is important because this provides atmospheric drag on satellites, eventually causing them to fall from orbit if no action is taken to maintain the orbit.

Upper boundary of Earth
In principle, the exosphere covers distances where particles are still gravitationally bound to Earth, i.e. particles still have ballistic orbits that will take them back towards Earth. The upper boundary of the exosphere can be defined as the distance at which the influence of solar radiation pressure on atomic hydrogen exceeds that of Earth's gravitational pull. The exosphere, observable from space as the geocorona, is seen to extend to at least  from Earth's surface.

Exosphere of other celestial bodies
If the atmosphere of a celestial body is very tenuous, like the atmosphere of the Moon or that of Mercury, the whole atmosphere is considered exosphere.

See also
 Aeronomy
 List of natural satellites

References

External links
 Gerd W. Prolss: Physics of the Earth's Space Environment: An Introduction. 

Atmosphere